The Kiwetinok River is a short river in British Columbia. It is the largest tributary of the Amiskwi River.

Course 
The Kiwetinok rises in Kiwetinok Pass, not in Kiwetinok Lake, which is actually the source of the Little Yoho River and not in the Kiwetinok or Amiskwi River drainages. Kiwetinok Lake actually is at the east end of the pass, while the Kiwetinok River runs from the west end. The Kiwetinok does not have any major tributaries.

See also
List of British Columbia rivers

References 

Rivers of British Columbia
Rivers of the Canadian Rockies
Kootenay Land District